The year 2001 was the 220th year of the Rattanakosin Kingdom of Thailand. It was the 56th year in the reign of King Bhumibol Adulyadej (Rama IX), and is reckoned as year 2544 in the Buddhist Era.

Incumbents
King: Bhumibol Adulyadej
Crown Prince: Vajiralongkorn
Prime Minister: 
until February 9: Chuan Leekpai
starting February 9: Thaksin Shinawatra
Supreme Patriarch: Nyanasamvara Suvaddhana

Events
 January 6 - 2001 Thai general election was held on January 6. Thaksin Shinawatra was elected Prime Minister of Thailand.

Births

Deaths

References

External links

 
Years of the 21st century in Thailand
Thailand
Thailand
2000s in Thailand